Our Diary is a 2017 South Korean action drama film directed by Lim Gong-sam.

Cast
Yoon Sung-mo as Soo-ho
 Park Sang-hoon as young Soo-ho
Shin Ji-hoon as Hyeon-soo 
Jung Han-bi as Kyeong-ah
Cho Min-ho as Jin-yeong
Lee Hyung-won as Pil-ho
Kong Jung-hwan as Seoul thug 1
Jang-won as Seoul thug 2
Song Eun-yool as So-yeon 
Moon Chae-hong as Yoo-mi 
Yang Taek-ho as Hurricane member 1

References

External links

2017 films
South Korean action drama films
2010s South Korean films